Los Jairas was a Bolivian folk music group that was active in the 1960s. Their work features the charango, a stringed instrument from Bolivia.

World Music wrote that "In Bolivia innumerable groups have followed the Los Jairas model. Among the more prominent — through tours or recordings — are Los K'jarkas, Savia Andina, Khanata, Los Quipus, Wara, Los Yuras, Grupo Aymara and Paja Brava."

Los Jairas formed in 1965 by Edgar 'Yayo' Jofré, who brought the group together to play at Pena Naira.

One of the early members was Gilbert Favre, founder of the folklore cabaret La Pena Naira in La Paz.

Members of the band:
Ernesto Cavour - charango
Edgar Joffré - voice, drums, zampoña (also called sicu)
Julio Godoy
Gilbert Favre - quena (kena)

Favre was a Swiss jazz player who played the quena with great skill and sensitivity.

On several of their albums, they featured Alfredo Dominguez, one of the finest Bolivian guitar players who wrote and composed many songs. His appearance on the album Grito de Bolivia was the highlights of Los Jairas' research into neo-folklore.

Michelle Bigenho wrote in Intimate Distance that

Gilka Cespedes wrote that Los Jairas

Fernando Rios wrote that

World Music wrote that

Partial discography
Los Jairas
Edgar Joffre - Los Jairas 
Grito de Bolivia- Los Jairas (1967)
Sempre con...Los Jairas (1969)
Edgar "Yayo" Joffre y Los Jairas (1969)
La Flute Des Andes (1970)
Lo Mejor de los Jairas (1974)
Los Jairas en vivo (1976)
Canto a la viva (1978)
Al Pueblo de mis Ancestros (1992)

References

External links
 Los Jairas (group website)
 No Hay Revolucion Sin Canciones: Bolivian Nationalism and its Journey to the World Stage
 

Bolivian musical groups
Folk music groups